Ladislaus I of Poland (also Wladislaus I of Poland) may refer to:

Władysław I Herman (c. 1040–1102), Duke of Poland
Władysław I the Elbow-high (1261–1333), King of Poland (also known as Ladislaus the Short, or Władysław I Łokietek)

See also 
 Ladislaus I (disambiguation)
 Ladislaus (disambiguation)